Browns Mill is an unincorporated community in Fairfax County, Virginia, United States. Browns Mill is located at the intersection of Beulah and Browns Mill Roads midway between the Dulles Toll Road (Virginia State Route 267) and the Leesburg Pike (State Route 7). Nearby is Wolftrap Stream Valley Park and Wolftrap Creek, which Browns Mill once operated upon.

References

Unincorporated communities in Fairfax County, Virginia
Washington metropolitan area
Unincorporated communities in Virginia